Umbilicus may refer to:
The navel or belly button
Umbilicus (mollusc), a feature of gastropod, Nautilus and Ammonite shell anatomy
Umbilicus (plant), a genus of over ninety species of perennial flowering plants
Umbilicus urbis Romae, the designated center of the city of Rome from which and to which all distances in Rome and the Roman Empire were measured
Umbilicus mundi, or "the world's navel", a Greek artifact
Umbilicus, an American rock band that includes members of death metal bands.